The Journal of Communication in Healthcare: Strategies, Media, and Engagement in Global Health is a quarterly peer-reviewed healthcare journal covering the field of health communication across the intersecting fields of healthcare, public health, global health, and medicine. It is published by Taylor & Francis and the editor-in-chief is Renata Schiavo (Columbia University Mailman School of Public Health; Health Equity Initiative; and Strategies for Equity and Communication Impact).

Abstracting and indexing
The journal  is abstracted and indexed in:
CAB Abstracts
Chemical Abstracts Service
CINAHL
EBSCO databases
Index Medicus/MEDLINE/PubMed
 Scopus

References

External links

Communication journals
Health policy journals
Taylor & Francis academic journals
English-language journals
Health communication
Quarterly journals
Publications established in 2008